Madhurima Roy (born 12 April 1991) is an Indian actress known for Criminal Justice and India's Next Top Model (season 3).

Early life 
Roy hails from Kolkata, West Bengal. she was born on 12 April 1991. Roy Graduated in bachelor's degree in commerce from Symbiosis College of Arts and Commerce, Pune University.

Career 
Roy Started her career with her first travel Docu-fiction for Discovery channel called NEXA journeys on Asian Highway one for S-Cross. She later got selected for India's next top model (season 3) for MTV India. Roy appeared in her debut web-series (Love, Lust and Confusion) for Viu India and shortly after that she was seen in Kaushiki (web-series). Thereafter, marking her notable appearance in Criminal Justice for Hotstar produced by BBC and applause entertainment.

Filmography

Web series

Feature films

Short films

Television

Docu-Ficton shows

References

External links 

Indian actresses
Indian female models
Living people
1991 births